Shunosaurus, meaning "shu lizard", is a genus of sauropod dinosaur from Late Jurassic (Oxfordian) beds in Sichuan Province in China, approximately 159±2 million years ago. The name derives from "Shu", an ancient name for the Sichuan province.

Discovery and species

The first fossil of Shunosaurus was discovered in 1977 by a group of students, practising paleontological excavation at a road bank. The type species, Shunosaurus lii, was described and named by Dong Zhiming, Zhou Shiwu and Zhang Yihong in 1983. The generic name derives from "Shu", an ancient name for Sichuan. The specific name honours hydrologist Li Bing, the governor of Sichuan in the third century BC.

The holotype, IVPP V.9065, was collected from the Lower Xiashaximiao Formation near Dashanpu, Zigong. It consists of a partial skeleton. Later about twenty more major specimens were discovered, including several complete or near-complete skeletons, skulls and juveniles, making Shunosaurus one of the best anatomically known sauropods, with 94% of all skeletal elements identified. Shunosaurus skeletons are on display at the Zigong Dinosaur Museum in Zigong, Sichuan Province, and the Tianjin Natural History Museum. 

A proposed second species, S. ziliujingensis, a name mentioned in the Zigong museum guide to indicate a smaller and older form, has never been formally described, and thus remains a nomen nudum.

In 2004 a partial semi-articulated specimen from Jiangyi Township in Yuanmou County was described as the new species Shunosaurus jiangyiensis. It is known from nine cervicals, 15 dorsals, three sacrals, four caudals, both scapulae, the right coracoid and clavicle, the right forelimb lacking the hand, a pubis and ischium and the right hindlimb, found in the upper section of the Middle Jurassic Xiashaximiao Formation. The species was separated from Shunosaurus lii based on its unique pectoral girdle, but was described as otherwise very similar to both Shunosaurus lii and Kunmingosaurus.

Description
Shunosaurus was very short-necked for a sauropod, being only "surpassed" in this respect by Brachytrachelopan. The skulls found are mostly compressed or disarticulated and the interpretation of the head form has varied from broad, short and deep to extremely narrow and pointed. The upper and lower jaws were strongly curved upwards, allowing them to function as a pair of garden shears. They show a unique combination of a cylindrical body ending in a spatulate tip. The club was probably used to fend off predators.

Classification

Shunosaurus was originally classified as a member of the Cetiosaurinae; in 1992 Dong assigned it to Shunosaurinae within the Cetiosauridae.

Cladistic analyses have rendered conflicting results. In 1995 Paul Upchurch published a study in which Shunosaurus belonged to the Euhelopodidae together with other Jurassic Chinese sauropods. However, an analysis by Jeffrey Wilson in 2002 indicated it had a very basal position within the Eusauropoda. Shunosaurus is perhaps related to Rhoetosaurus from Queensland in Australia.

Paleobiology
 
Its neck length indicates that Shunosaurus was a low browser. The form of its jaws is well-adapted to processing large amounts of coarse plant material.

Shunosaurus accounts for 90% of the fossils found in the Dashanpu fauna, showing it was a dominant and/ or common member of its habitat and environment. It shared the local Middle Jurassic landscape with other sauropods, Datousaurus, Omeisaurus and Protognathosaurus, the possible ornithopod Xiaosaurus, and the early stegosaur Huayangosaurus, as well as the carnivorous theropod Gasosaurus.

References

 

Middle Jurassic dinosaurs of Asia
Eusauropoda
Taxa named by Dong Zhiming
Fossil taxa described in 1983
Paleontology in Sichuan